Said Mourad (born 1 June 1983), is an Egyptian footballer who plays for Egyptian Premier League side El Dakhleya as a midfielder.

References

1983 births
Living people
Egyptian footballers
Association football midfielders
Egyptian Premier League players
Baladeyet El Mahalla SC players
Olympic Club (Egypt) players
El Entag El Harby SC players
Ittihad El Shorta SC players
Misr Lel Makkasa SC players
Al Masry SC players
Pyramids FC players
Haras El Hodoud SC players
El Dakhleya SC players